Kris Barman, known professionally as Wuki, is an American musician, record producer, and DJ. He was a member of the electronic rock band Innerpartysystem from 2007 to 2011 where he sang back up vocals, played the guitar and synthesizer, and helped with programming.

Early life 
In a 2018 article with marijuana.com, Barman recalls how he got his start in music. "I started playing instruments when I was like 13 — I started playing guitar. Started making beats when I was 16 on Fruity Loops. Between 19 and 20, a buddy of mine that was always a huge fan of our local scene started a band, an electro-rock band. I dropped out of school to go do that. I dropped out of college to go pursue this band."

In an interview with Nest HQ, a self-described "culture-garnering media platform" conceived by the dance music superstar Skrillex, Barman reflects on his earliest influences the initial spark of interest in electronic dance music. "I played guitar growing up so I definitely listened to a lot of punk / alt music. But when I heard The Prodigy's “Smack My Bitch Up" things changed."

Career 
On August 3, 2011, after touring extensively for many years with his band Innerpartysystem, the band announced in an e-mail to fans that they were to be going on an indefinite hiatus; the band has not reformed since. Barman moved to Denver, CO and began producing and performing under the moniker Wuki. One of his first gigs as Wuki was hosting the late night radio show E-Lven on Denver's 93.3 FM.

Wuki has since gone on to grow his solo project into the globally recognizable name it is today, racking up over 45 million streams across all platforms to-date for his music.
Delivering his first-ever self release as Wuki in 2012 with a four-track EP called ‘Something For Everyone Vo. 1’, he continued to produce memorable tracks in the years to follow, including ‘Diwali’, ‘Buffalo Bass’, ‘Jungle Funk’ and ‘That’s Right’. In 2015, Wuki gained worldwide recognition for his remix of RL Grime and Big Sean's 2015 hit ‘Kingpin’, that quickly shot the producer to the top of the charts. After releasing a substantial amount of music on notable imprints such as OWSLA, Main Course, Mad Decent, Fool's Gold, Ultra, Wuki wanted to take full-creative control over his own music and develop his own brand. He set up his own record label Wukileaks, a platform he uses for releasing edits and supporting friends that have clocked up millions of streams to date. 
Wuki's hit remixes and bootleg edits caught the eyes of industry heavyweights including Skrillex, Miley Cyrus, Selena Gomez, The Chainsmokers, Anna Lunoe, Zeds Dead, Diplo among many others, with the latter offering Wuki his own monthly radio show, Wukileaks Wednesdays, on Diplo's Revolution.
He was nominated for best remix at the 62nd Annual Grammy Award for the remix of Mother's Daughter.

He started off 2020 with a 16-date North American tour ‘Ro Sham Bo’ and four-track EP of the same name alongside fellow electronic visionary Nitti Gritti, giving both artists the chance to flex their energetic DJ styles and masterful production. At the end of 2020, he's set to release his first album ever, signed to HARD Records.

References

Musicians from Denver
Mad Decent artists
Owsla artists
Living people
1984 births